Micromonospora peucetia is an endophytic actinomycete.

References

External links

LPSN
Type strain of Micromonospora peucetia at BacDive -  the Bacterial Diversity Metadatabase

Micromonosporaceae
Bacteria described in 2005